Francis Willoughby  (1613 – April 10, 1671) was the son of Colonel William Willoughby (1588-1631) of London, England.  A merchant and shipwright, he immigrated to Charlestown, Massachusetts on August 22, 1638 and served as selectman (1640-1647), representative in 1649 and 1650, and was elected an assistant (representative in the colonial assembly) in 1650, 1651 and 1654.  Willoughby returned to England in 1651 where he was appointed commissioner of the navy at Portsmouth and served in the Third Protectorate Parliament in 1659, representing Portsmouth.  He returned to Massachusetts in 1662 and was deputy governor from 1665 until his death in 1671.

Further reading

References

1613 births
1671 deaths
Lieutenant Governors of colonial Massachusetts
Kingdom of England emigrants to Massachusetts Bay Colony